Nakuru County is a county in Kenya. It is County number 32 out of the 47 Kenyan Counties. Nakuru County is a host to Kenya's Forth City – Nakuru City. On 1 December 2021, President Uhuru Kenyatta awarded a City Charter status to Nakuru, ranking it with Nairobi, Mombasa, and Kisumu as the cities in Kenya. With a population of 2,162,202 (2019 census), it is the third most populous county in Kenya after Nairobi County and Kiambu County, in that order. With an area of 7,496.5 km2,  it is Kenya's 19th largest county in size. Until 21 August 2010, it formed part of Rift Valley Province.

Population

Sites of interest
Nakuru County is home to Lake Nakuru, Lake Elmenteita and Lake Naivasha, which are some of the Rift Valley soda lakes. Lake Nakuru is best known for its thousands, sometimes millions of flamingoes nesting along the shores. The surface of the shallow lake is often hardly recognizable due to the continually shifting mass of pink. The number of flamingos on the lake varies with water and food conditions and the best vantage point is from Baboon Cliff. Also of interest, an area of 188 km around the lake fenced off as a sanctuary to protect Rothschild giraffe and black rhinos.

Other sites of interest around Nakuru include Menengai Crater, an extinct volcano 2,490 m (8,167 ft) high, and the Nakuru National Park which is a wildlife zone. The views of the crater itself, as well as the surrounding countryside, are spectacular.

Hyrax Hill Prehistoric Site, discovered by the Leakeys in 1926, is considered a major Neolithic and Iron Age site. The adjoining museum features are from various nearby excavations.

The second-largest surviving volcanic crater in the world, the Menengai Crater is 2500 meters above sea level at its highest point. The crater plunges 500 m down from the rim and the summit is accessible by foot or vehicle 8 km from the main road. The mountain is also surrounded by a nature reserve.

The Rift Valley Institute of Science and Technology is a tourist attraction. It is a giant institute established in 1979 by the leaders and people of Rift Valley.

Urban areas 
Surrounding towns include Lanet, which lies approximately 10 km from Nakuru. Lanet is predominantly a residential town and is home to an army base. Njoro is another urban town that lies 20 km in the outskirts of Nakuru, and is a small agricultural town with a local university aimed at promoting agricultural development in Kenya, namely Egerton University (est. 1934). Naivasha is another major significant urban Centre in Nakuru County, which sits at the floor of the Great Rift Valley and serves as a major transit of goods. Travelers passing through Naivasha usually make stopovers along Naivasha – Nakuru Highway to enjoy the beautiful and scenic escarpments of the Great Rift Valley.

Urban Centres
 

The county has eleven constituencies: 
Naivasha Constituency represented by Hon. Jayne Wanjiru Njeri – United Democratic Alliance (UDA)
Nakuru Town West Constituency represented by Hon. Samuel Arama –  Jubilee Party
Nakuru Town East Constituency represented by Hon. David Gikaria – United Democratic Alliance (UDA)
Kuresoi South Constituency Hon. Joseph Kipkosgei Tonui – United Democratic Alliance (UDA)
Kuresoi North Constituency Hon. Mutai Alfred Kiprono – United Democratic Alliance (UDA) 
Molo Constituency represented by Hon. Francis Kuria Kimani – United Democratic Alliance (UDA)
Rongai Constituency represented by Hon. Paul Chebor – United Democratic Alliance (UDA)
Subukia Constituency represented by Hon. Samuel Kinuthia Gachobe – United Democratic Alliance (UDA)
Njoro Constituency represented by Hon. Charity Kathambi Chepkwony – United Democratic Alliance (UDA)
Gilgil Constituency represented by Hon. Martha Wangari Wanjira – United Democratic Alliance (UDA)
Bahati Constituency represented by Hon. Irene Njoki –  Jubilee Party

Nakuru County was seen as the epicenter of violence in the aftermath of the disputed 2007 Presidential Elections which left over 1,100 people dead and over 300,000 displaced nationwide.

Nakuru County Peace Accord 
The Nakuru County Peace Accord (or "Rift Valley Peace Accord") refers to the peace agreement signed on 19 August 2012 between elders of the Agikuyu (see also Kikuyu) and Kalenjin communities as well as other ethnic groups of Kenya.

The agreement was designed to address sources of ethnic conflict and a history of violence in the rift valley region of Kenya. It was signed following a 16-month-long peace process led by the National Cohesion and Integration Commission and the National Steering Committee on Peace Building and Conflict Management

Notable residents 
 Carole Kariuki, businesswoman and executive

See also

Narok County
Kajiado County
Baringo County
Laikipia County
Kericho County
Bomet County
Nyandarua County
Kiambu County
Nakuru County Council

References

External links
Nakuru County Directory Kenya
Office for the Coordination of Humanitarian Affairs – Kenya AdminLevels 1-4

 
Counties of Kenya